Cocceius may refer to:

 Cocceius (skipper), a genus of butterfly
 Cocceius Auctus, Roman architect
 Johannes Cocceius (1603–1699), Dutch theologian

See also 
 Cocceia gens
 Cocceji